Bona Septano (born 22 September 1987) is an Indonesian former badminton player. He currently works as pilot in Indonesian airlines.

Bona Septano concentrates on men's doubles with Mohammad Ahsan. They have competed successfully on the international circuit including a finals appearances at the 2011 Japan Super Series. Unlike many other top doubles players he does not play in mixed doubles. After Olympic Games in London the pair was separated. And later was pairing with Fran Kurniawan. He is the younger brother of Markis Kido and the older brother of Pia Zebadiah Bernadet.

Achievements

BWF World Championships 
Men's doubles

Southeast Asian Games 
Men's doubles

World University Championships 
Men's doubles

Mixed doubles

BWF Superseries (2 runners-up) 
The BWF Superseries, which was launched on 14 December 2006 and implemented in 2007, was a series of elite badminton tournaments, sanctioned by the Badminton World Federation (BWF). BWF Superseries levels were Superseries and Superseries Premier. A season of Superseries consisted of twelve tournaments around the world that had been introduced since 2011. Successful players were invited to the Superseries Finals, which were held at the end of each year.

Men's doubles

  BWF Superseries Finals tournament
  BWF Superseries Premier tournament
  BWF Superseries tournament

BWF Grand Prix (6 titles) 
The BWF Grand Prix had two levels, the Grand Prix and Grand Prix Gold. It was a series of badminton tournaments sanctioned by the Badminton World Federation (BWF) and played between 2007 and 2017.

Men's doubles

  BWF Grand Prix Gold tournament
  BWF Grand Prix tournament

BWF International Challenge/Series (1 title, 2 runners-up) 
Men's doubles

  BWF International Challenge tournament
  BWF International Series tournament

Performance timeline

National team 
 Senior level

Individual competitions 
 Senior level

Record against selected opponents 
Men's doubles results with Muhammad Ahsan against Super Series finalists, Worlds Semi-finalists, and Olympic quarterfinalists.

  Cai Yun & Fu Haifeng 0–5
  Cai Yun & Xu Chen 0–1
  Chai Biao & Guo Zhendong 1–4
  Guo Zhendong & Xie Zhongbo 0–1
  Guo Zhendong & Xu Chen 0–3
  Liu Xiaolong & Qiu Zihan 5–1
  Fang Chieh-min & Lee Sheng-mu 3–2
  Mathias Boe & Carsten Mogensen 1–5
  Lars Påske & Jonas Rasmussen 1–2
  Mads Conrad-Petersen & Jonas Rasmussen 1–0
  Anthony Clark & Nathan Robertson 0–3
  Markis Kido & Hendra Setiawan 1–1
  Angga Pratama & Ryan Agung Saputra 2–1
  Hendra Aprida Gunawan & Alvent Yulianto 2–1
  Shintaro Ikeda & Shuichi Sakamoto 1–1
  Hirokatsu Hashimoto & Noriyasu Hirata 1–0
  Hiroyuki Endo & Kenichi Hayakawa 4–0
  Jung Jae-sung & Lee Yong-dae 0–3
  Ko Sung-hyun & Yoo Yeon-seong 1–5
  Mohd Zakry Abdul Latif & Mohd Fairuzizuan Mohd Tazari 2–1
  Choong Tan Fook & Lee Wan Wah 1–1
  Koo Kien Keat & Tan Boon Heong 3–2
  Adam Cwalina & Michał Łogosz 1–0
  Bodin Isara & Maneepong Jongjit 1–1
  Howard Bach & Tony Gunawan 1–0

References

External links 

 
 
 

1987 births
Living people
Sportspeople from Medan
Indonesian male badminton players
Badminton players at the 2012 Summer Olympics
Olympic badminton players of Indonesia
Competitors at the 2009 Southeast Asian Games
Competitors at the 2011 Southeast Asian Games
Southeast Asian Games gold medalists for Indonesia
Southeast Asian Games bronze medalists for Indonesia
Southeast Asian Games medalists in badminton
Universiade bronze medalists for Indonesia
Universiade medalists in badminton
Medalists at the 2007 Summer Universiade
21st-century Indonesian people
20th-century Indonesian people